Moshe Aharon Poleyeff (1888 – 1966) was an American rabbi, teaching at Yeshiva University (YU) in New York where he was a Rosh Yeshiva for over 45 years, training generations of rabbis, including Rav Mordechai Gifter.

Biography

He was a student of Rabbi Isser Zalman Meltzer, from whom he received his smicha in 1910; married 1912.

Poleyeff arrived in the United States in 1920, and immediately began a teaching career at Yeshiva University in New York, where for about 46 years he was one of the most revered YU/RIETS Roshei Yeshiva. His Talmidim numbered in the thousands. His "Thursday Shiur" teaching methodology incorporated a student-presented topic, followed by discussion; he helped the student prepare the prior week or two.

Rav Poleyeff died 2 Kislev 5727 (1966); on his 25th Yartzeit, a former student with whom he had ongoing correspondence, Rabbi Mordechai Gifter, spoke in the NYC shul of son Rabbi Yisroel Poleyeff. YU's Rabbi Hershel Schachter spoke at the 30th. For the 50th Yartzeit, YU/RIETS made a special gathering.

Works
 Machaneh Yisroel
 Be'er Avraham
 Ohr HaShemesh
 Orach Mishor

References

 From Washington Avenue to Washington Street, by Aaron Rakefet-Rothkoff. Gefen Publishing House, 2011 ( and 9789652299857).
 Rebbi: The Memoirs of Rabbi Moshe Aharon Poleyeff (1995)

External links
 YU archive article

1888 births
1966 deaths
Belarusian Haredi rabbis
American people of Belarusian-Jewish descent
American Haredi rabbis
20th-century American rabbis
Rosh yeshivas
Authors of books on Jewish law
Orthodox rabbis from New York City
Yeshiva University rosh yeshivas